Alyaksandr Davidovich (born 13 February 1981) is a retired Belarusian professional footballer. His latest club was Belita-Viteks Uzda in 2014.

External links

Profile at teams.by

1981 births
Living people
Belarusian footballers
Belarusian expatriate footballers
Expatriate footballers in Lithuania
Expatriate footballers in Ukraine
FK Žalgiris players
FC Smorgon players
FC Dinamo-Juni Minsk players
FC Arsenal Kharkiv players
FC Helios Kharkiv players
FC Vitebsk players
FC Slavia Mozyr players
FC Granit Mikashevichi players
FC Veras Nesvizh players
FC Slutsk players
FC Uzda players
Association football defenders